Hieracium sylvularum is a species of flowering plant belonging to the family Asteraceae.

Its native range is Europe to Caucasus.

Synonyms:
 Hieracium chrysomaurum Hyl.
 Hieracium grandidens Dahlst.
 Hieracium pseudograndidens Schljakov

References

sylvaticum